Live CD may refer to:

 Live CD, a computer operating system written to a bootable CD, and run as a "live" operating system. See also Live USB
 A "live" CD, meaning a recorded live performance album
 Live CD, an album by Ivri Lider

See also 
 Boot CD, a boot disk on CD media, media required to start a computer
 Live USB, more recent form of Live CD